Aníbal Francisco Palma Fourcade (31 October 1935 – 16 February 2023) was a Chilean politician who served as minister and ambassador.

References

External Links
 Profile at Annales de la República

1935 births
2023 deaths
20th-century Chilean lawyers
20th-century Chilean politicians
University of Chile alumni
Radical Party of Chile politicians
Democratic Socialist Radical Party politicians
Socialist Party of Chile politicians
Chilean Ministers of Education
Housing ministers of Chile
Chilean Ministers Secretary General of Government
Ambassadors of Chile to Colombia
Politicians from Santiago